Jeffrey 'Jeff' Teale (20 December 1939 – 16 January 1997) was a British international athlete

Athletics career
He competed in the 1968 Summer Olympics. He was suspended for life in 1974 by the British Amateur Athletic board after admitting in a newspaper article that he uses steroids.

During the period that he used steroids (1967-1972) he represented England and won a silver medal in the shot put, at the 1970 British Commonwealth Games in Edinburgh, Scotland. Under current athletics legislation the medal would not recognised.

References

1939 births
1997 deaths
British male shot putters
English male shot putters
Olympic athletes of Great Britain
Athletes (track and field) at the 1968 Summer Olympics
Sportspeople from Yorkshire
Commonwealth Games medallists in athletics
Athletes (track and field) at the 1970 British Commonwealth Games
Commonwealth Games silver medallists for England
Medallists at the 1970 British Commonwealth Games